William Charles Moore  (born April 13, 1929) is a retired major general in the United States Army. He served as Director of Operations, Readiness and Mobilization in the Office of the Deputy Chief of Staff for Operations and Plans. He graduated from the United States Military Academy with a B.S. degree in military science in 1952. Moore was awarded two Bronze Star Medals for his service as an infantry officer during the Korean War and three Silver Star Medals for his service as commander of the 2nd Battalion, 35th Infantry Regiment during the Vietnam War.

References

1929 births
Living people
People from Akron, Ohio
United States Military Academy alumni
United States Army personnel of the Korean War
United States Army personnel of the Vietnam War
Recipients of the Air Medal
Recipients of the Meritorious Service Medal (United States)
Recipients of the Silver Star
Recipients of the Legion of Merit
United States Army generals
Recipients of the Defense Superior Service Medal
Recipients of the Distinguished Service Medal (US Army)
Recipients of the Defense Distinguished Service Medal